TRACECA  (acronym: Transport Corridor Europe-Caucasus-Asia) is an international transport programme involving the European Union and 12 member states of the Eastern European, Caucasus, and Central Asian region. The programme aim is to strengthen economic relations, trade, and transport in the regions of the Black Sea basin, South Caucasus, and Central Asia. It has a permanent Secretariat, originally financed by the European Commission, in Baku, Azerbaijan, and a regional office in Odessa, Ukraine. Since 2009, the organization has been entirely financed by member countries.

Origins
TRACECA was established in May 1993 in Brussels, upon the signing of a Multilateral Agreement on International Transport for the development of transport initiatives (including the establishment and development of a road corridor) between the EU member states, Eastern European, Caucasus and Central Asian countries. The programme supports the political and economic independence of former Soviet Union republics through enhancing their access to European and global markets through road, rail and sea.
The objectives of TRACECA were underlined by the Baku Initiative of 2004, followed by a further ministerial conference in Sofia, Bulgaria, in 2006.

Membership

The following states currently participate in the TRACECA program:

Iran officially joined TRACECA in 2009 after their request was accepted during a meeting held in Brussels. However, technical assistance related to the project has not been provided to Iran since 2010 due to EU sanctions.

In 1996, Mongolia was granted observer status.

In 2009, Lithuania was granted observer status.

In July 2016, Greece announced they are considering joining TRACECA activities as an observer. In March 2018, Greece was granted observer status during a meeting held in Yerevan.

Secretary-General
The Permanent Secretariat of TRACECA was established in March 2000 in Baku, and inaugurated on February 21, 2001 with the participation of the then President of Azerbaijan Heydar Aliyev, together with Javier Solana, Christopher Patten, Anna Lind. The Secretary-General is a chief executive officer of the Permanent Secretariat. The first Secretary-General elected by the Intergovernmental Commission was a representative of Georgia, ambassador Zviad Kvachantiradze.

The current Secretary-General is Mircea Ciopraga, appointed by the Intergovernmental Commission in January 2015.

Projects
TRACECA has five working groups: maritime transport, aviation, road and rail, transport security, and transport infrastructure. Amongst its specific projects, was the creation of a new bridge to replace and protect the heritage Red Bridge, located between Georgia and Azerbaijan.

See also
Baku Initiative
Eastern Partnership
Euronest Parliamentary Assembly
European integration
Trans-European Transport Networks
Transport in Europe

References

External links
 Official site

Transport and the European Union
Transport in Bulgaria
Transport in Azerbaijan
Transport in Armenia
Transport in Iran
Transport in Georgia (country)
Transport in Kazakhstan
Transport in Kyrgyzstan
Transport in Moldova
Transport in Tajikistan
Transport in Uzbekistan
Transport in Romania
Transport in Turkey
Transport in Turkmenistan
Transport in Ukraine
European Commission projects